Iron On was an Australian indie rock band from Brisbane, Queensland.

History

The band formed in 2002 after members Kate Cooperand Ross Hope met at university. Not long after, Ian Rogers joined, and Iron on was forged – named after a Superchunk song. After three years original drummer Nicola Phoenix was replaced by Marieca Page.

Iron on releases to date consist of debut EP "The Understudy" (2003), EP "Everybody Calm Down" (2004), debut album "Oh The Romance" (2005) and EP "The Verse" (2007). They were nominated for "favourite new international artist/group" in 2006 by Canadian Music Week.

According to the band's Myspace profile, Iron on has disbanded.   Kate Cooper now plays in the band An Horse along with Damon Cox, drummer for bands Intercooler and Mary Trembles. Ian Rogers plays bass guitar in duo No Anchor. Ross Hope has started a new pop/rock band called Disco Nap.

Recording

Oh The Romance

Iron on recorded their debut album in a renovated Church turned Studio out in Applewood, Ipswich with ARIA award-winning producer Magoo (Regurgitator, Midnight Oil, Jebediah, Kate Miller-Heidke).

The band members remarked on the setting of the recording studio as being 'alarmingly similar to the Great Northern Hotel in Twin Peaks'

Success

Since forming in July 2002, Iron on have also toured around Australia and played as far afield as Canada, alongside such illustrious artists as Sleater Kinney (US), Ben Kweller (US), Kaki King (US), Magic Dirt (AUS), Screamfeeder (AUS), The Superjesus (AUS), The Gossip (US), Tegan and Sara (CAN), Shout Out Louds (SWE) and The Shins (US).

In 2003 Iron on played the Brisbane leg of the Livid Festival and in January 2005 played the Big Day Out. November 2005 they were selected by Triple J for the Next Crop promotion in celebration of Oz Music Month.

In December 2005 Rave Magazine named them "Rave Critics Choice 2005" for debut album Oh the Romance. In February 2006 the band hit the road with Canadian songwriting wonder-twins Tegan and Sara. Shortly after, the band showcased at Canadian Music Week (CMW) in Toronto, where they were shortlisted for the "2006 Indies" in the "Favourite New Artist/International Group" category. and managed to create a stir with Canadian fans and critics alike.

Their release of "Oh The Romance" was met with acclaim across Brisbane and Australia, with a number of local street press and local community radio stations making it their album of the week.

Discography

EPs
The Understudy (2003)
Ruddy
Best Or Less
Old Cat
Everything Takes Too Long
Sleep In
Everybody Calm Down (2004)
Fifty-Four Equals Two Hundred
Watch Me Stumble
Butter on the Brakes
Repetition, Repetition
Arrange Me
I Had To Read It More Than Once
The Verse (2007)
One Man Band
Showing Signs
Snow (Applewood Session)
Can't Concentrate (Applewood Session)
Terrible Year

Albums
Oh The Romance (2005)
Learn Today Earn Tomorrow
Reckless Pronto
Playing Hard To Want
Sidewalk
Hearts
There's A Shirt of Yours at My House
The Safety
High Miami High
Keeping Up Appearances
More Than Tape

References

External links 
Official website
Myspace page
Iron On @ Plus One Records
Time Off Live Review of Oh The Romance EP Launch
The Understudy EP Review from AMO.org.au

Australian rock music groups
Musical groups established in 2002
Musical groups disestablished in 2009
Musical groups from Brisbane